Seann William Scott (born October 3, 1976) is an American actor. He is known for his role as Steve Stifler in the American Pie franchise, and also for his role as Doug Glatt in both Goon and Goon: Last of the Enforcers. He has also appeared in films Dude, Where's My Car? (2000), Final Destination (2000), Road Trip (2000), Evolution (2001), The Dukes of Hazzard (2005), Mr. Woodcock (2007) and Role Models (2008). He has voiced Crash in four Ice Age animated feature films and two Ice Age television specials. Scott portrayed former CIA operative Wesley Cole in Fox's crime-drama television series Lethal Weapon (2018–2019). Films in which Scott has starred have earned $4.91 billion at the global box office as of 2017.

Early life 
Seann William Scott was born in Cottage Grove, Minnesota, to Patricia Anne Simons and William Frank Scott. Scott's father died in 2007. He is the youngest of his seven siblings. He graduated from Park High School, where he was part of the varsity football and basketball teams. He has attended University of Wisconsin and Glendale Community College. Scott dedicated himself to acting and relocated to Los Angeles.

Career

1996–2013: Breakthrough with American Pie films 
Early in his career, Scott worked at The Home Depot and the Los Angeles Zoo to support himself between acting jobs. Scott began his career by appearing in several television commercials, including American Express and Sunny Delight. He also featured in the Aerosmith music video ‘Hole in my Soul’. In 1996, Scott made his first on-screen appearance as Moondoggie on The WB's sitcom Unhappily Ever After in the episode "Beach Party." Scott landed the role of Steve Stifler in the comedy film American Pie (1999). Scott has revealed that he was paid $8,000 for his supporting role in the first film. American Pie grossed over $235 million at the worldwide box office. Scott reprised his role as Steve Stifler in the film's three sequels, American Pie 2 (2001), American Wedding (2003), and American Reunion (2012). Scott received a reported $5 million salary and a percentage of the profits for his performance in American Reunion.

In 2017, Forbes reported that the American Pie films have grossed $989.5 million at the worldwide box office, became a pop culture phenomenon and made several cast members famous. Scott won two Teen Choice Awards for Choice Sleazebag as a result of playing Steve Stifler in American Pie and American Pie 2, and MTV Movie Award for Best Dance Sequence for American Wedding. He also shared an MTV Movie Award for Best Kiss with Jason Biggs for their kiss in American Pie 2.

Scott's fear of typecasting led him to play different types of characters post-American Pie, such as a hapless nerd in the horror film Final Destination (2000) and a friendly stoner in Dude, Where's My Car? (2000). Dude, Where's My Car? was a box office success and has managed to achieve a cult status. The film earned $73.2 million worldwide against a $13 million budget. He also appeared in films Road Trip (2000), Jay and Silent Bob Strike Back (2001), Evolution (2001), Stark Raving Mad (2002) and Bulletproof Monk (2003). He played Peppers in Old School (2003), which was a moderate box office success and has gained a massive cult following over the years. Scott portrayed Bo Duke in The Dukes of Hazzard (2005), which was also financially successful, but received negative reviews from critics. The film eventually collected $111 million worldwide. He was nominated for MTV Movie Award for Best On-Screen Team with Jessica Simpson and Johnny Knoxville for their roles in The Dukes of Hazzard. Scott hosted the MTV Movie Awards 2003 with Justin Timberlake.

Scott landed a lead role as a police officer in Southland Tales (2007), where he reunited with Dwayne "The Rock" Johnson, with whom he had previously worked in The Rundown (2003). The two performed several skits, including scenes from The Matrix Reloaded, which are on The Matrix Reloaded DVD. He has also hosted Saturday Night Live and appeared as a guest co-host on Live with Regis and Kelly. Scott appeared as John Farley in Mr. Woodcock (2007) and as Jeff Nichols in Trainwreck: My Life as an Idiot (2007). His next film, Role Models (2008) was a commercial success and grossed over $92 million at the box office worldwide. The film was met with positive reviews and was selected as one of the best films of 2008 by Eye Weekly.
He voiced the character Crash in Ice Age: The Meltdown and reprised his role in its sequel Ice Age: Dawn of the Dinosaurs (2009) and Ice Age: Continental Drift (2012). He appeared in the action-comedy film Cop Out (2010) alongside Bruce Willis, Tracy Morgan and Kevin Pollak. To prepare for his role in Cop Out, Scott gained weight and stopped working out for six months. In 2011, Scott starred in the Canadian sports comedy film Goon as Doug 'The Thug' Glatt. The film was a critical success and made $6.7 million at the worldwide box office. In 2012, he starred in Movie 43 in the segment 'Happy Birthday'. In April 2012, Scott received an honorary medal from Trinity College’s Philosophical Society. In October 2013, Scott guest-starred in an episode of the FX television series It's Always Sunny in Philadelphia, playing Mac's cousin named Country Mac.

2014–present: Continued film success and transition to television 
Scott expressed his interest to shift from comedic roles into more serious roles and portrayed Ted Morgan in the comedy-drama film, Just Before I Go (2015). "It was rewarding to play pretty much the antithesis of what I've done in the past. To get a chance to play a totally different character—because he's just a good, average, relatable guy going through obviously an awful moment in his life—was great," Scott told Variety. He reprised his roles as Crash in Ice Age: Collision Course (2016) and as Doug 'The Thug' Glatt in Goon: Last of the Enforcers (2017). Scott made a cameo appearance as a Vermont State Trooper in the 2018 film sequel, Super Troopers 2.

Scott portrayed the lead role of Evan in horror film Bloodline (2018). Executive producer of Bloodline Emma Tammi praised Scott's performance and acting skills by saying: "He has an amazing theater background and is a very versatile actor, and I don’t think most of the world has seen that yet. He was excited to approach this character in a way that would surprise people, and he really nails it." In May 2018, it was announced that Scott was cast as the new series lead in Fox's Lethal Weapon as a new character named Wesley Cole, replacing Clayne Crawford as Martin Riggs, who was fired amidst reports of bad behavior and incidents of hostility.  Darren Franich of Entertainment Weekly praised Scott's addition to the cast and called his performance "charming". On May 10, 2019, Fox canceled the show after three seasons. Scott portrayed abusive stepfather Martin in the coming-of-age road film Already Gone (2019), which was executive produced by Keanu Reeves.

In February 2020, Scott landed the role of Father Joe in the Fox comedy pilot Welcome to Flatch, written by Jenny Bicks and based on the British television series This Country.

Personal life
In interviews, Scott rarely talks about his personal life, and he has described himself as "a private guy". 

Media outlets reported that Scott dated former Victoria's Secret fashion model Deanna Miller from 2005 to 2008. 

In March 2012, Scott confirmed that he had proposed on Valentine's Day and became engaged to fashion model Lindsay Frimodt. In January 2013, Us Weekly reported that this engagement had ended and that the two had split, but would remain friends. 

He married interior designer Olivia Korenberg in September 2019.

Filmography

Film

Television

Music videos

Video games

Web series

References

External links

 
 Seann William Scott Interview at UGR

1976 births
20th-century American male actors
21st-century American male actors
American male film actors
American male television actors
Film producers from Minnesota
Living people
Male actors from Minnesota
People from Cottage Grove, Minnesota
University of Wisconsin–Madison alumni